Ettore Pignatelli e Caraffa, 1st Duke of Monteleone, also spelled Carafa (Naples, Italy (died Palermo, Sicily, 1535), also known as Héctor Pignatelli, 1st Count of Monteleone since 1505, afterwards 1st Duke of Monteleone and Count of Borrello, was an Ambassador in Naples, Italy, of king Ferdinand II of Aragón (1453–1516), where his maternal half-sister Juana of Aragón was the young second Queen Consort of Naples, the 2nd wife of king Ferrante I of Naples.

In the war of the French against the Republic of Venice, 1511–1513, he was taken prisoner to France in the defeat, for the Spaniards, known as Battle of Ravenna, 10 April 1512, while the acting Viceroy of Naples  was Ramón de Cardona.

In 1517, the now 17 years old king Charles I of Spain on advice of his international war counselors awarded him the title of Viceroy of Sicily, 1517 - 1535. He replaced there Hugo of Moncada, as Hugo of Moncada, apparently, had suggested to put as Viceroy an "Italian" to calm the restlessness of the Sicilians with the Spanish seamen and troopers concentrating there to fight against the Tunisian and Algerian sailors and warriors seeking defense alliances with the Ottoman Turks.

In 1523, he managed to quench some restlessness from Sicilian families, namely the Spadafora family group. In 1527, king Charles I of Spain rewarded him by changing the 1st County of Monteleone to 1st Duchy of Monteleone.

The Mediterranean Sea side capital of Libya, Tripoli, conquered for Spain  by Navarrese Pedro Navarro, count of Oliveto, had been assigned in 1523 by Charles V, Holy Roman Emperor to the Knights of St. John who had lately been expelled by the Ottoman Turks from their stronghold on the island of Rhodes. From 1523 - 1530 the same was done with the Sicilian ruled islands of Gozo and Malta, with the character of suzerain's as a perpetual fief, of the Emperor and the Viceroy of Sicily, namely, Ettore Pignatelli e Caraffa.

In 1532, Suleiman the Magnificent besieged Vienna unsuccessfully again, as in 1529, and it were Pignatelli e Caraffa and Genovese Admiral Andrea Doria, who had  changed in 1528 his contract as a mercenary condottiero at the service of France to fighting under king Charles I of Spain the Holy Roman Emperor, who went in a conquering expedition to what is now Greece.

They received naval assistance, among others, of the Sicilian kingdom, the Naples kingdom, and of the Spanish viceroys and Captain Generals in Andalucia, Castile, Aragon, Valencia and Catalonia, dealing with ship transports of troops within the Mediterranean Sea at the time. They conquered Koroni, at Messenia, Greece. Patras, with some short time reconquering by the westerners was however mainly a Greek located Turkish port till about 1828. Around 1534, both places lost contact with Sicily.

References
 

Dukes of Italy
Viceroys of Sicily
1535 deaths
Ambassadors of Spain
Year of birth unknown
Ettore
Ettore
Ambassadors to the Kingdom of Naples